The 2022–23 Pittsburgh Panthers women's basketball team represented The University of Pittsburgh during the 2022–23 NCAA Division I women's basketball season. The Panthers were led by fifth year head coach Lance White, and played their home games at the Petersen Events Center as members of the Atlantic Coast Conference.

The Panthers finished the season 10–20 overall and 3–15 in ACC play to finish in fifteenth place.  As the fifteenth seed in the ACC tournament, they lost their First Round matchup with Clemson.  They were not invited to the NCAA tournament or the WNIT.  After the season Head Coach Lance White was fired.

Previous season

The Panthers finished the season 11–19 overall and 2–16 in ACC play to finish in a tie for fourteenth place.  As the fifteenth seed in the ACC tournament, they lost their First Round matchup with Duke.  They were not invited to the NCAA tournament or the WNIT.

Off-season

Departures

Incoming transfers

Recruiting Class

Source:

Roster

Schedule

Source:

|-
!colspan=6 style=| Regular season

|-
!colspan=6 style=| ACC Women's tournament

Rankings

Coaches did not release a Week 2 poll and AP does not release a poll after the NCAA tournament.

References

Pittsburgh Panthers women's basketball seasons
Pittsburgh
Pittsburgh
Pittsburgh